Thomas Fitzherbert (ca. 1550–1600) was an English politician.

He was a Member (MP) of the Parliament of England for Newcastle-under-Lyme in 1593.

References

1550s births
1600 deaths
Members of the Parliament of England for Newcastle-under-Lyme
English MPs 1593